Powellhurst-Gilbert is a neighborhood in the Southeast section of Portland, Oregon.  It borders the neighborhoods of Montavilla, Hazelwood, and Mill Park on the north, Centennial on the east, Pleasant Valley on the east and south, and Lents and South Tabor on the west.

According to the Neighborhood Plan, the neighborhood is named after two of its schools: Powellhurst (named in the 1920s after 1850s settler Jackson Powell) and Gilbert (named after William M. Gilbert, an Indiana emigrant who settled in the area c. 1890).
Settlement of the community by farmers via the Donation Land Claim Act began in the middle of the 19th century.  Rail service to Portland began in 1892, spurring residential development.  The resulting suburb was gradually annexed by Portland beginning in the 1960s and completing in 1994.

The neighborhood includes the Jade District commercial and cultural center.

Powellhurst-Gilbert contains Portland's largest Asian population, making up 17.89% of the city's population.

See also
 Heart Beacon (2013)
 Kelly Butte Natural Area

References

External links
 Outer Southeast Community Plan: Adopted Powellhurst-Gilbert Neighborhood Plan (Portland Bureau of Planning, March, 1996)
 Guide to Powellhurst Gilbert Neighborhood (PortlandNeighborhood.com)
Powellhurst-Gilbert Street Tree Inventory Report

 
Former census-designated places in Oregon
Neighborhoods in Portland, Oregon